Mohan Singh Bisht is an Indian politician and the Member of Uttarakhand lagislative assembly,representing Lalkuan constituency. He is a member of the Bharatiya Janata Party.

References

Place of birth missing (living people)
Living people
Bharatiya Janata Party politicians from Uttarakhand
Uttarakhand MLAs 2022–2027
People from Nainital district
Year of birth missing (living people)